The 34th Annual Stellar Awards was held on March 29, 2019, at the Orleans Arena in Las Vegas, and later aired for the first time on American digital cable and satellite television network BET on April 19. Musician Kirk Franklin hosted the ceremony.

The ceremony recognized the best gospel music recordings, compositions, and artists of the eligibility year, which ran in 2018.

Delores Washington Green of The Caravans was given the Legend Award. James Robinson Jr., Jackie Patillo and Phil Thornton were inducted into the Stellar Honors Hall of Fame. On behalf of Aretha Franklin, the members of Franklin's family were presented with the inaugural Aretha Franklin Icon Award.

Jonathan McReynolds, who received the most nominations, also received the most wins of the night by winning in each of his nominated categories.

Nominations announcement
Nominations were announced during a radio press tour on January 15, 2019.

Nominations
 Please note: The winners are highlighted in bold text and listed first in each category.

General
Artist of the Year
 Jonathan McReynolds
 Jekalyn Carr
 Maranda Curtis
 Todd Dulaney

Song of the Year
 "Not Lucky, I'm Loved" 
Jonathan McReynolds, Terrell Demetrius Wilson, and Anna B. Warner (songwriters)
 "Nobody Like You Lord"
Maranda Curtis & Anthony Rachel (songwriters)
 "Won't He Do It"
Makeba Riddick, Richard Shelton, and Loren Hill (songwriters)
 "You Know My Name" (Live) 
Tasha Cobbs Leonard & Brenton Brown (songwriters)

CD of the Year
 Make Room - Jonathan McReynolds Bible of Love - Snoop Dogg
 Open Heaven - Maranda Curtis
 Your Great Name - Todd Dulaney

New Artist of the Year
 Jabari Johnson Cheryl Thomas-Fortune
 PJ Morgan
 Phil Thompson

Vocalist
Female Vocalist of the Year (also referred to as the "Albertina Walker Female Vocalist of the Year")
 Jekalyn Carr Maranda Curtis
 Koryn Hawthorne
 Tori Kelly
 Tasha Page-Lockhart

Contemporary Female Vocalist of the Year
 Tasha Page-Lockhart Koryn Hawthorne
 Benita Jones
 Tori Kelly

Traditional Female Vocalist of the Year
 Jekalyn Carr Maranda Curtis
 Tammi Haddon
 Shana Wilson-Williams

Male Vocalist of the Year
 Jonathan McReynolds Kelontae Gavin
 Tye Tribbett
 Brian Courtney Wilson

Contemporary Male Vocalist of the Year
 Jonathan McReynolds Todd Dulaney
 Kelontae Gavin
 Tye Tribbett

Traditional Male Vocalist of the Year
 VaShawn Mitchell Keith "Wonderboy" Johnson
 Earnest Pugh
 Jarrell Smalls

Group
Duo/Chorus of the Year
 The Walls Group Donald Lawrence & Tri-City
 Isaiah D. Thomas and Elements of Praise
 Judah Band

Contemporary Duo/Chorus of the Year
 The Walls Group Donald Lawrence & Tri-City
 God's Chosen
 Judah Band

Traditional Duo/Chorus of the Year
 Keith "Wonderboy" Johnson Gospel Legends
 Jarrell Smalls & Company
 Nu Tradition

Quartet of the Year
 Keith "Wonderboy" Johnson Gospel Legends
 Jarrell Smalls & Company
 The Wardlaw Brothers

Choir
Choir of the Year
 Bishop Noel Jones & City of Refuge Sanctuary Choir Dexter Walker & Zion Movement
 The Brooklyn Tabernacle Choir
 Vincent Tharpe and Kenosis

Traditional Choir of the Year
 Bishop Noel Jones & City of Refuge Sanctuary Choir Demetrius West & Jesus Promoters
 Dexter Walker & Zion Movement
 The Brooklyn Tabernacle Choir

Contemporary Choir of the Year
 New Direction Brent Jones & the Waco Community Choir
 Dr. Alyn E. Waller Presents Fresh Anointing
 Vincent Tharpe and Kenosis

Packaging
Recorded Music Packaging of the Year
 Road to DeMaskUs
Israel Houghton, art director (Israel Houghton)
 Open Heaven
Justin Foster, art director (Maranda Curtis)
 Make Room
Keemon Leonard, art director (Jonathan McReynolds)
 One Nation Under God
Octavious Holmes, art director (Jekalyn Carr)

Production
Producer of the Year
 Make Room
Jonathan McReynolds and Darryl "Lil Man" Howell, production team (Jonathan McReynolds)
 The Beautiful Project
Kirk Franklin, Ronald Hill, Phil Thornton, Clifton Lockhart, Tasha Page-Lockhart, Myron Butler, Dontaniel Kimbrough, Zeek Listenbee, Cordell Walton, Edward "6Mile JP" Page, Charles "Ollie" Harris, Daniel Bryant, Bryan Popin & AyRon Lewis, production team (Tasha Page-Lockhart)
 The Other Side
Kirk Franklin, Ronald Hill, Warryn Campbell, Phil Thornton, production team (The Walls Group)
 Your Great Name
Todd Dulaney and Dontaniel Jamel Kimbrough, production team (Todd Dulaney)

Urban
Urban/Inspirational Single or Performance of the Year
 "Not Lucky, I'm Loved" - Jonathan McReynolds
 "Forever" - Jason Nelson
 "Never Alone" - Tori Kelly and Kirk Franklin
 "Reckless Love" - Israel Houghton

Rap/Hip Hop Gospel CD of the Year
 "God Knows" - Flame
 "BLSD" - Jor'Dan Armstrong
 "I Ain't Preaching to the Choir" - Miz Tiffany
 "Praise" - Emcee N.I.C.E.

Music Video
Music Video of the Year
 "Won't He Do It" - Casey Cross
 "A Great Work" - Matt Reed
 "For My Good" - G. Randy Weston
 "My Life (Grateful)" - Patrick Tohill

Miscellaneous CD of the Year
Contemporary CD of the Year
 Make Room - Jonathan McReynolds
 Bible of Love - Snoop Dogg
 The Higher Experience - Kelontae Gavin
 Your Great Name - Todd Dulaney

Traditional CD of the Year
 One Nation Under God - Jekalyn Carr A New Season - Jarrell Smalls & Company
 Run to the Altar - Bishop Noel Jones & City of Refuge Sanctuary Choir
 The River - Keion D. Henderson

Special Event CD of the Year
 The Best of Fred Hammond - Fred Hammond Bible of Love - Snoop Dogg
 Evidence - Elevation Collective
 WOW Gospel 2018 - Various Artists

Praise and Worship CD of the Year
 Your Great Name'' - Todd Dulaney
 Everlasting - Shana Wilson-Williams
 The Higher Experience - Kelontae Gavin
 Open Heaven'' - Maranda Curtis

Children's
Youth Project of the Year
 Pure N Heart
 Christian Bolar
 Personal Praise
 The Children Speak

Radio
Major Market of the Year
 WPZE Praise 102.5, Atlanta
 WGRB Inspiration 1390AM, Chicago
 WNAP 1110 AM, Philadelphia
 WYCA 92.3 FM WPRS-FM, Hammond/Chicago

Large Market of the Year
 WFMI-FM 100.9 FM, Virginia Beach
 WJXY 103.5 FM/93.7 FM, Myrtle Beach
 WOKB 1680AM, Orlando
 WXHL 89.1FM, Wilmington

Medium Market of the Year
 WCGL AM 1360/FM 94.7, Jacksonville
 WPZZ 104.7 FM, Richmond
 WREJ 101.3FM, Richmond
 WTJZ Praise 104.9FM, Chesapeake

Small Market of the Year
 WIMG 1300AM, Ewing
 WDJL-AM 1000, Huntsville
 WEHA GOSPEL 88.7 & 100.3 FM, Egg Harbor 
 WHBT 1410 AM & 98.3 FM, Tallahassee

Internet Station of the Year
 uGospel Radio, http://uGospel.com
 Gospel Central Radio, http://www.thegospelcentral.com 
 SOAR Radio, http://soarradio.com

Hip Hop Station of the Year 
 GH3 Radio - "God's House of Hip Hop," http://www.gh3radio.com

Gospel Announcer of the Year
 Dwight Stone, WPZE Praise 102.5, Atlanta, GA
 Linda Greenwood, WNAA 90.1 FM, Raleigh, NC
 Randi Myles, WDMK-HD2, Detroit, MI
 Sherry Mackey, WHAL 95.7, Memphis, TN

Category changes
For the 34th Annual Stellar Awards, multiple category changes are being made;
 In the Female Vocalist of the Year, the number of nominees was increased from four to five due to a tie in the nomination process.
 The category Instrumental CD of the Year was omitted.

References

External links
 

2019 in American music
2019 music awards
March 2019 events in the United States
Stellar Awards 34